Radyo Bandera 99.7 News FM (DYEA-FM 99.7 MHz) is an FM station owned by Palawan Broadcasting Corporation and operated by Bandera News Philippines. Its studio and transmitter are located along Brgy. Pulot Center, Sofronio Española, Palawan

History

MOR 99.7 (2011–2017)
The station was inaugurated in 2011 as MOR 99.7 For Life! under the ownership of ABS-CBN Corporation. It had a shared coverage with another network-owned FM station in Puerto Princesa City in the other side of the province that reached in the southern part of the said mentioned area due to its location. The station went off the air in 2017.

Radyo Bandera 99.7 (2021–present)
In 2021, Bandera News Philippines took over the station's operations and became part of the Radyo Bandera News FM network. It moved to its current home in Brgy. Pulok Center.

References

Radio stations in Palawan
Radio stations established in 2021
2021 establishments in the Philippines